William Stratford  D.D. (born Manchester 29 June 1672died Oxford 7 May 1729) was an English priest in the 18th century.

Stratford was educated at Christ Church, Oxford.  He became Chaplain of the House of Commons and Archdeacon of Richmond in 1703. He was Chaplain to Charles II, James II and William andMary.

Notes

17th-century English Anglican priests
Archdeacons of Richmond
Alumni of Trinity College, Cambridge
Chaplains of the House of Commons (England)
1672 births
1729 deaths